The tenth edition of the South American Championship was held in Santiago, Chile, from 12 October to 3 November 1926.

Overview 

The participating countries were Argentina, Bolivia, Chile, Paraguay, and Uruguay.

Brazil withdrew for the second time (being the first time in 1924), and it also was the first time Bolivia took part in the event.

Squads 
For a complete list of participants squads see: 1926 South American Championship squads

Final round 
Each team plays one match against each of the other teams. Two points are awarded for a win, one point for a draw and zero points for a defeat.

Chile made the first corner-kick goal in Tournament's History.

Result

Goal scorers 

7 goals
  David Arellano
6 goals
 
  Héctor Castro
  Héctor Scarone

5 goals
  Gabino Sosa

4 goals
  Manuel Ramírez

3 goals

  Roberto Cherro
  Benjamín Delgado
  Pablo Ramírez

2 goals

  De Miguel
  Guillermo Subiabre
  Carlos Ramírez
  Borjas
  Zoilo Saldombide

1 goal

  Domingo Tarasconi
  Teófilo Aguilar
  Carlos Soto
  Humberto Moreno
  Manuel Fleitas Solich
  Ildefonso López
  Luis Vargas Peña
  Ángel Romano

External links 
 South American Championship 1926 at RSSSF

 
1926
1926
1926 in South American football
1926 in Chilean football
1926 in Argentine football
1926 in Uruguayan football
1926 in Bolivia
1926 in Paraguayan football
October 1926 sports events
November 1926 sports events
Sports competitions in Santiago
1920s in Santiago, Chile